"Pineapple" is a song by American singer Ty Dolla $ign featuring American rappers Gucci Mane and Quavo of Migos. It was released on March 30, 2018, as the fourth and final single from Ty's second studio album, Beach House 3  (2017).

Release and composition
Ty Dolla Sign previewed "Pineapple" at a concert in North Carolina March 27, 2018.

Commercial performance
"Pineapple" peaked at number 18 on the Billboard Bubbling Under Hot 100, with no official impact date set for radio. On January 31, 2019, the single was certified gold by the Recording Industry Association of America (RIAA) for sales of over 500,000 digital copies in the United States.

Music video
The official music video was released June 20, 2018 and features a dancing Pineapple surrounded by each performer and scantily dressed women.

Charts

Weekly charts

Certifications

References

2018 singles
2018 songs
Ty Dolla Sign songs
Gucci Mane songs
Quavo songs
Atlantic Records singles
Songs written by Ty Dolla Sign
Songs written by Gucci Mane
Songs written by Quavo
Songs written by Hitmaka
Song recordings produced by Yung Berg
Songs written by CashMoneyAP